This list contains the name of some notable Memons.

A
Abdool Razack Mohamed
Abdul Gaffar Billoo
Abdul Rashid Godil
Abdul Razzak Yaqoob
Abdul Sattar Edhi
Abdullah Haroon
Aboobaker Osman Mitha
Adamjee Haji Dawood
Ahmed Dawood
Ahsan Bawa 
Aqeel Karim Dhedhi
Altaf Khanani
Arif Habib
Ashraf W. Tabani

B
Bantva Memons
Bilquis Edhi

G
Ghulam Mohammad A. Fecto

I
Iqbal Sacranie
Irfan Pardesi

M
Mahmoud Haroon
Maria Memon
Maulana Muhammad Ilyas Qadri
Muhammad Umar Memon
Marvi Memon
Masood Parekh

N
Nisar Memon

T 
Tiger Memon

S
Sanam Saeed
Salman Iqbal
Salim Makani
Saud Memon
Siddiq Ismail
Sharjeel Memon

Y
Yakub Memon

References

Memon